My Darling or variants may refer to:

Geography
My Darling, Limpopo, a town in Capricorn District Municipality, Limpopo province, South Africa

Music

Albums
My Darling (album), by Jocie Kok

Songs
"My Darling", by The Aquatones
"My Darling", by Eminem, from the album Relapse
"My Darling", by The Jacks, sung by Ted Taylor
"My Darling", by Juliana Hatfield, from the album Only Everything
"My Darlin'", by Miley Cyrus, from the album Bangerz
"My Darlin", by Tiwa Savage, from the album R.E.D
"My Darling", by Richard Myers and Edward Heyman
"My Darling", by Wilco, from the album Summerteeth

See also
Mi Tesoro (disambiguation)